Araçoiaba da Serra is a city in the state of São Paulo in Brazil. It is part of the Metropolitan Region of Sorocaba. The population is 34,776 (2020 est.) in an area of 255.33 km². The elevation is 625 m. The name Araçoiaba comes from the Tupi language, meaning "hider of the sun". This name comes from a single mountain nearby that the natives noted hid the sun as it set in the area.

Population history

Demographics

According to the 2000 IBGE Census, the population was 19,816, of which 13,679 are urban and 6,137 are rural. The average life expectancy was 71.1 years. The literacy rate was at 92.14%.

References

External links
  http://www.aracoiaba.sp.gov.br 
  Araçoiaba da Serra on citybrazil.com.br 

Municipalities in São Paulo (state)